This is a list of mayors of Naranjito, Puerto Rico.

The current Mayor of Naranjito is Orlando Ortíz Chevres, from the New Progressive Party (PNP), elected in 2008. He became first mayor of the New Progressive Party in Naranjito in its extensive political history.

19th century

20th century

21st century

*Source: Puerto Rico Encyclopedia

Notes

References

 

Naranjito